Per Kasperi (born 20 May 1993) is a Swedish ice sledge hockey player. He plays for Nacka HI, and has spina bifida .

He represented Sweden at the 2010 Winter Paralympics and the 2018 Winter Paralympics.

References

External links
Profile at Svenska Handikappidrottsförbundet
Profile at Vancouver 2010

1993 births
Living people
2010 Winter Paralympians of Sweden
2014 Winter Paralympians of Sweden
2018 Winter Paralympians of Sweden
Ice sledge hockey players at the 2010 Winter Paralympics
Ice sledge hockey players at the 2014 Winter Paralympics
Para ice hockey players at the 2018 Winter Paralympics